Ethan Stoller is an American composer, music editor and producer from Chicago, Illinois.

Stoller's first film score was for the independently produced Roadrunner (dir. Christopher Blasingame) in 2001. Stoller has composed three film scores: Red Hook Justice (dir. Meema Spadola) aired on PBS; Loving & Cheating (dir. Thom Powers) premiered on Cinemax; License to Play (dir. Ann Rose) and "Julie and the Clown" (dir. Stephanie Sellars) were independent films on the festival circuit.

In 2006, he produced the track "BKAB" which appeared in the film V for Vendetta. The track featured the unusual mix of Indian beats and Hindi vocals (sampled from the Bollywood films Main Khiladi Tu Anari and Raja Hindustani), speech excerpts by Malcolm X and Gloria Steinem, and a heavy guitar riff. Stoller collaborated with the Wachowskis again in 2006, co-producing (with Kaotic Drumline's Jamie Poindexter) a cover version of The Alan Parsons Project's Sirius and other incidental music for the player introductions at Chicago Bulls home games that is currently used. He also worked with Lilly Wachowski composing the score for Showtime series Work in Progress.

Among the CDs he has produced are I Believe In You by Dynamite Ham—an eclectic tribute to songwriters Frank Loesser and Dr. Frank of The Mr T Experience; Arthi Meera, the self-titled debut of the Chicago singer-songwriter; the debut CD by The Kaotic Drumline; Cynthia Lin's "Doppelganger"; Jessica Fogle's "Du Bist Einen Fogle!"; and Xoe Wise's "Echo." He has also worked on recording projects with Mavis Staples, Kelly Hogan, Nora O'Connor, and Psalm One.

Stoller has contributed music to the DVD featurettes and promo materials of several major Hollywood films, including Speed Racer (film), The Spirit (film), Orphan, Whiteout (2009 film), Ninja Assassin, Sherlock Holmes (2009 film), Watchmen (film), Lethal Weapon, Beastly (film), Unknown (2011 film), Sherlock Holmes: A Game of Shadows, The Apparition, 42 (film), Non-Stop (film), and Jupiter Ascending.
He has also composed music for commercials and industrial films, including work for Human Rights Watch, Center for Community Justice, and Chicago's The Second City in addition to TV spots for Safeway and the Chicago Blackhawks with the Mayfair Workshop composers group.

References

External links
 
 

Living people
American male composers
21st-century American composers
Whitney M. Young Magnet High School alumni
21st-century American male musicians
Year of birth missing (living people)